Karolainy "Karol" Caline Alves (born 30 April 1997) is a Brazilian footballer who plays for Croatian football team ŽNK Split.

Career
Karol Alves was born into a middle-class family in Mauá neighborhood, Baixo Guandu, a city in  the Brazilian northwestern region of Espírito Santo. She began her career in 2015 at Vila Velha ES from Vila Velha where she won 2 regional championships. In 2018 she joined América Mineiro where she won her first regional cup, she then transferred to Ipatinga later the same year.
In 2019, she joined Osasco Audax where she won three clean sheets in three matches, due to her performance, she was signed by ŽNK Split in June 2019, helping them win their first ever Croatian women's league title.
She made her first UEFA Women's Champions League appearances for ŽNK Split at the 2019–20 UEFA Women's Champions League qualifying round.

References

External links
 

1997 births
Living people
Brazilian women's footballers
Women's association football goalkeepers
Croatian Women's First Football League players
ŽNK Split players
Expatriate women's footballers in Croatia
Brazilian expatriate sportspeople in Croatia